The following is a list of notable events and releases of the year 1970 in Norwegian music.

Events

May
 13 – The 18th Bergen International Festival started in Bergen, Norway (May 13 – 27).

June
 The 7th Kongsberg Jazz Festival started in Kongsberg, Norway.

July
 The 11th Moldejazz started in Molde, Norway.

Albums released

Unknown date

F
 Svein Finnerud Trio
 Plastic Sun (Sonet Records)

G
 Jan Garbarek Quartet
 Afric Pepperbird (ECM Records)
 Rowland Greenberg & His Group
 Swing Is The Thing! (Music For Pleasure)

K
 Karin Krog
 Some Other Spring, Blues And Ballads (Sonet Records), with Dexter Gordon

N
 Bjarne Nerem
 How Long Has This Been Going On (Polydor Records)

R
 Terje Rypdal
 Min Bul (Polydor Records), with Bjørnar Andresen and Espen Rud

Deaths

 August 
 15 – Karl Andersen (66), cellist and composer.

Births

 January
 16 – Liv Marit Wedvik, country singer (died 2015).
 26 – Eskil Brøndbo, drummer, D.D.E.

 February
 9 – Eldbjørg Raknes, jazz vocalist and composer.
 13 – Karoline Krüger, singer, songwriter, and pianist.

 March
 19 – Harald Johnsen, jazz double bassist (died 2011).
 22 – Live Maria Roggen, jazz singer, songwriter and composer.

 April
 1 – Tone Lise Moberg, jazz vocalist.
 7 – Leif Ove Andsnes, classical pianist and chamber musician.
 25 – Kjersti Stubø, jazz vocalist.

 May
 19 – Vidar Busk, guitarist, vocalist, composer and record producer.

 June
 7 – Even "Magnet" Johansen, singer and songwriter.
 19 – Øyvor Volle, violinist.

 July
 6 – Harald Nævdal, guitarist and text writer, Immortal.
 14 – Jacob Young, jazz guitarist, music arranger, composer, and band leader.
 16 – Jørn Skogheim, guitarist, clarinetist, composer, record producer, music arranger, and music teacher.
 24 – Anja Garbarek, singer and songwriter.

 August
 21 – Simone Eriksrud, jazz singer and composer.

 October
 5 – Tord Gustavsen, jazz pianist and composer.
 6 – Maria Kannegaard, jazz pianist.
 17 – Heine Totland, singer.
 20 – Håvard Lund, jazz saxophonist and composer.

 Unknown date
 Bjørn Bolstad Skjelbred, composer, music arranger, improviser, and music teacher.

See also
 1970 in Norway
 Music of Norway

References

 
Norwegian music
Norwegian
Music
1970s in Norwegian music